Coleophora vulpecula is a moth of the family Coleophoridae. It is found from Germany to the Iberian Peninsula, Italy and Bulgaria. It has also been recorded from northern Russia.

The larvae feed on Onobrychis arenaria. They create a lobe case, consisting of two rows of large, untidily projecting leaf fragments that give the appearance of a bundle of dried leaves. The mouth angle is about 45° Larvae can be found from September to June of the following year.

References

vulpecula
Moths of Europe
Moths described in 1849